The Broken Hill Complex (code BHC), an interim Australian bioregion, is located in both New South Wales and South Australia, and comprises an area of  of inland Australia.

IBRA 5.1 describes BHC as being:
Hills and colluvial fans on Proterozoic rocks; desert loams and red clays, lithosols and calcareous red earths; supporting chenopod shrublands Maireana spp. - Atriplex spp. shrublands, and mulga open shrublands Acacia aneura.

See also

 Geography of Australia

References

IBRA regions
Biogeography of New South Wales
Biogeography of South Australia